Alan Diaz (May 15, 1947 – July 3, 2018) was an American photographer who won the 2001 Pulitzer Prize for Breaking News Photography for his photograph of the United States Border Patrol's BORTAC team's seizure of Elian Gonzalez.

Diaz was born and raised in New York City and moved to Cuba with his family in 1964. In Cuba, Diaz became a teacher and studied photography with Cuban photographer Korda (Alberto Diaz Gutierrez). He moved to Miami in 1978 and became a photographer and English teacher. He joined the Associated Press as a freelance photographer in 1994 and became a staff photographer in 2000.

Diaz retired from the Associated Press in December 2017 and died on July 3, 2018, aged 71.

References

1947 births
2018 deaths
American expatriates in Cuba
American people of Cuban descent
American photojournalists
Artists from Miami
Photographers from New York City
Writers from New York City
Associated Press photographers
Pulitzer Prize for Photography winners